Pana is an Mbum language of the Central African Republic. A few thousand speak it in southern Chad and northern Cameroon. A dialect in Cameroon, Man, may be a separate language. Blench (2004) leaves Pondo and Gonge in CAR unclassified within the Mbum languages.

Distribution
Pana is spoken around Belel (Belel commune, Vina department, Adamawa Region), and in Mayo-Rey department, Northern Region. It is also found in CAR and Chad.

References

Roger Blench, 2004. List of Adamawa languages (ms)

Languages of the Central African Republic
Languages of Cameroon
Languages of Chad
Mbum languages